Sally Anne Brooker  is a New Zealand inorganic chemist. She has been a full professor at the University of Otago since 2006.

Education
Brooker was educated at Hawarden Area School in North Canterbury from 1970 to 1982, and was dux of the school in her final year there. She went on to study chemistry at the University of Canterbury, first graduating Bachelor of Science with first-class honours, and then completing a PhD titled Synthesis and characterisation of polynuclear complexes with macrocyclic and related ligands under the supervision of Vickie McKee in 1989.

Academic and research career
After a period of post-doctoral research with George Sheldrick at the University of Göttingen, Brooker returned to New Zealand to take up a lectureship in chemistry at the University of Otago in 1991. She rose to become a full professor in 2006.

Brooker's research is in the fields of transition-metal and macrocyclic chemistry. Her work has included the development of molecular switches and molecular magnets, with potential application in nanodevices.

Honours and awards
In the 2017 Queen's Birthday Honours, Brooker was appointed a Member of the New Zealand Order of Merit, for services to science. Later that year, she won the Hector Medal from the Royal Society of New Zealand. Also in 2017, Brooker was selected as one of the Royal Society Te Apārangi's "150 women in 150 words", celebrating the contributions of women to knowledge in New Zealand.

Brooker was elected a Fellow of the Royal Society of New Zealand in 2007, and a Fellow of the Royal Society of Chemistry in 2011. She is also a Fellow of the New Zealand Institute of Chemistry. She was awarded the University's Distinguished Research Medal in 2015.

Selected works

References

Living people
Year of birth missing (living people)
New Zealand women academics
Members of the New Zealand Order of Merit
People from North Canterbury
University of Canterbury alumni
Academic staff of the University of Otago
New Zealand chemists
Inorganic chemists
New Zealand women chemists
Fellows of the Royal Society of New Zealand
Fellows of the Royal Society of Chemistry
Fellows of the New Zealand Institute of Chemistry
People educated at Hurunui College